Gyri is a settlement in the municipal unit Artemisia, on Zakynthos island, Greece. Its population is 34 (2011 census). Two roads connect the town, one which goes through the neighbouring town of Loucha, and one which comes from Agia Marina. The town consists of a main road which most of the buildings are located on. There is a church, a one-room school house, two taverns and the rest are houses.

References

External links
Greek Travel Pages - Gyri

Populated places in Zakynthos